Khule-Aam  is a 1992 Indian Hindi-language film starring Dharmendra. The film was the last directorial venture of Guru Dutt's eldest son Tarun Dutt who committed suicide during production. His younger brother Arun Dutt completed the film.

Plot
Khule aam is the story of a number of characters who keep facing problems in their lives. An honest farmer (Shiva) pays the price for his honesty when his wife is killed. Inspector Rathod who is forced to get his hands dirty to find his father's true killer. Sikander, an innocent truck driver gets accused of a murder he did not commit.

Cast
Shammi Kapoor as Sikandar / Bhola
Dharmendra as Shiva
Moushumi Chatterjee as Roopa
Chunky Pandey as Surya
Neelam Kothari as Priya
Sadashiv Amrapurkar as Champaklal
Danny Denzongpa as Inspector Uday Singh Rathod / Ranveer Singh Rathod (Double Role) 
Iftekhar as Colonel Pratap Singh Rana 
Jagdish Raj as Police Inspector		
Viju Khote as Police Inspector

Soundtrack
The music was composed by R. D. Burman and the lyrics were penned by Indeevar

External links
 

1992 films
1990s Hindi-language films
Films scored by R. D. Burman